Federation of Malaya competed in the 1962 Asian Games held in Jakarta, Indonesia from 24 August 1962 to 4 September 1962. This country is ranked number 8 with 2 gold medals, 4 silver medals and 9 bronze medals.

Medal summary

Medals by sport

Medallists

Athletics

Men
Track events

Combined events – Decathlon

Women
Field event

Badminton

Basketball

Men's tournament
Group C

Seventh to ninth place classification

Ranked 9th in final standings

Cycling

Road

Field hockey

Men's tournament
Team roster

Mike Shepherdson
Kandiah Anandarajah
Ho Koh Chye
Manikam Shanmuganathan
Michael Arulraj
Doraisamy Munusamy
Lawrence van Huizen
Chua Eng Wah
Chelliah Paramalingam
Mani Sockalingam
Rajaratnam Yogeswaran
Arumugam Sabapathy
Aboo Samah
Mohd Hariff Taib
Ismail Ali
Robin Jayesuria

Group A

Semifinal

Bronze medal match

Ranked 3rd in final standings

Football

Men's tournament
Squad

Sexton Lourdes
Tunku Ismail
Yee Seng Choy
Ahmad Nazari
Foo Fook Choon
Abdullah Nordin
Kamaruddin Ahmad
Edwin Dutton
Boey Chong Liam
Roslan Buang
I. J. Singh
Stanley Gabrielle
Abdul Ghani Minhat
Robert Choe
Mahat Ambu
Arthur Koh
M. Govindarajoo
Richard Choe
Ibrahim Mydin

Group A

 Malaya won a draw for second place against Indonesia on 30 August, necessary as they were both equal on points and goal average.

Semifinal

Bronze medal match

Ranked 3rd in final standings

Volleyball

Men's tournament (nine-a-side)
Final round

|}

|}

Ranked 6th in final standings

References

Nations at the 1962 Asian Games
1962
Asian Games